Devil's Coulee Dinosaur Heritage Museum, located in Warner, Alberta, Canada, is a key historic site in southern Alberta. In 1997, ten fossilized dinosaur eggs, believed to have come from a Hadrosaur, specifically a Hypacrosaurus were found at Devil's Coulee site. These were not the first fossils to be found in what was often called the Fossil Coulee region of the province and as a result the town of Warner established the museum to help interpret the story.

Affiliations
The Museum is affiliated with: CMA, CHIN, and Virtual Museum of Canada.

References

External links

Buildings and structures in the County of Warner No. 5
Museums in Alberta
Natural history museums in Canada
Dinosaur museums